Chin is a hamlet in southern Alberta, Canada within the Lethbridge County.

Chin is a name derived from the Blackfoot language.

Demographics 

See also 
List of communities in Alberta
List of designated places in Alberta
List of hamlets in Alberta

References 

Hamlets in Alberta
Designated places in Alberta
Lethbridge County